The Ministry of Justice was the justice ministry of the Ottoman Empire, based in Constantinople (now Istanbul). It also served as the Ministry of Religions.

It was established in 1879 as part of a reorganisation of the empire's legal system. Non-Muslim ecclesiastical authorities relied on the ministry. The ministry took control of the commercial courts and commercial appeal courts from the Ministry of Commerce.

Ioannis Vithynos served in the justice ministry as the director of criminal investigations.

Ministry of Justice (Turkey) currently governs affairs in Turkey.

References

Justice ministries
Justice
1879 establishments in the Ottoman Empire